Cora is a large genus of basidiolichens in the family Hygrophoraceae. Modern molecular phylogenetics research has revealed a rich biodiversity in this largely tropical genus.

Taxonomy
Cora was originally circumscribed by the Swedish "Father of Mycology", Elias Magnus Fries, in 1825. He included a single species, until then known as Thelephora pavonia . Until relatively recently, Cora was thought to contain one species, or was placed into synonymy with Dictyonema. Cora was recognized as an independent genus separate from Dictyonema in 2013. Molecular phylogenetic analysis using DNA barcoding of the internal transcribed spacer region has revealed the existence of almost 200 species in the genus, and about 450 species are predicted to exist.

Habitat and distribution
Mexico and (at least formerly) Florida are the northernmost distribution points for the genus Cora, while its southernmost locale is southern Chile. It has its highest biodiversity in the northern Andes. Biogeographic data suggests that Cora originated in South America and expanded eastward. The vast majority (95%) of the known species are found in the Americas, but the genus has also been recorded from tropical Africa, tropical Asia, and South Atlantic islands. Twelve species and subspecies have been described from Mexico; the only species known to have occurred north of Mexico is the possibly extinct Cora timucua, which is known to have formerly existed in Florida.

Species
, Species Fungorum accepts 90 species in genus Cora.

Cora accipiter  – northern Andes, South America
Cora applanata  – northern Andes, South America
Cora arachnodavidea  – Colombia
Cora arachnoidea  – northern Andes; Costa Rican Cordilleras
Cora arborescens  – Costa Rica
Cora arcabucana  – Colombia
Cora aspera  – Costa Rica; Colombia; Ecuador; Bolivia; Peru
Cora aturucoa  – Colombia
Cora auriculeslia  – Ecuador
Cora barbifera  – Colombia
Cora barbulata 
Cora benitoana  – Oaxaca, Mexico
Cora boleslia  – central Andes, Bolivia
Cora buapana  – Oaxaca, Mexico
Cora byssoidea  – Colombia
Cora caliginosa  – Peru
Cora campestris  – Brazil
Cora canari  – Ecuador
Cora caraana  – Brazil
Cora casanarensis  – Colombia
Cora casasolana  – Oaxaca, Mexico
Cora caucensis  – Colombia
Cora celestinoa  – Colombian Andes
Cora ciferrii 
Cora comaltepeca  – Oaxaca, Mexico
Cora corani  – Bolivia
Cora corelleslia  – Colombia
Cora crispoleslia  – northern Andes (Colombia, Ecuador)
Cora cuzcoensis  – Peru
Cora cyphellifera  – Ecuador
Cora dalehana  – Colombia
Cora davibogotana  – Colombia
Cora davicrinita  – northern Andes (Colombia, Ecuador)
Cora davidia  – northern Andes (Colombia and Ecuador)
Cora dewisanti  – northern Andes (Venezuela to Ecuador)
Cora dulcis  – Oaxaca, Mexico
Cora elephas  – Colombia; Ecuador
Cora fimbriata  – Colombia
Cora fuscodavidiana  – Colombia
Cora galapagoensis  – Galapagos Islands
Cora garagoa  – Colombia
Cora gigantea  – Colombia
Cora glabrata 
Cora gomeziana  – Costa Rica
Cora guajalitensis  – Ecuador
Cora guzmaniana  – Oaxaca, Mexico
Cora hafecesweorthensis  – Colombia
Cora haledana  – Costa Rica
Cora hawksworthiana  – Chile; Colombia; Costa Rica
Cora hirsuta 
Cora hochesuordensis  – Bolivia
Cora hymenocarpa  – Costa Rica
Cora imi  – Costa Rica
Cora inversa  – Colombia
Cora itabaiana  – Brazil
Cora ixtlanensis  – Oaxaca, Mexico
Cora lawreyana  – Veracruz, Mexico
Cora leslactuca  – Colombia
Cora marusae  – Oaxaca, Mexico
Cora maxima  – Bolivia
Cora minor 
Cora minutula  – Ecuador
Cora palaeotropica  – Sri Lanka
Cora palustris  – Costa Rica
Cora parabovei  – Bolivia
Cora paraciferrii  – northern Andes (Colombia and Venezuela)
Cora paraminor  – Costa Rica
Cora pastorum  – Colombia
Cora pavonia 
Cora pichinchensis  – Ecuadorian Andes
Cora pikynasa  – Colombia
Cora pseudobovei  – Bolivia
Cora pseudocorani  – Bolivia
Cora putumayensis  – Colombia
Cora quillacinga  – Colombia
Cora rothesiorum  – Colombia
Cora rubrosanguinea  – Ecuador
Cora sanctae-helenae  – Saint Helena
Cora santacruzensis  – Galapagos, Ecuador
Cora schizophylloides  – Colombia
Cora setosa  – Colombia
Cora smaragdina  – Costa Rica
Cora soredavidia  – Costa Rica
Cora squamiformis  – Ecuadorian and Bolivian high Andes
Cora strigosa  – Peru
Cora subdavicrinita  – northern Andes (Colombia, Ecuador)
Cora suturifera  – Ecuador
Cora terrestris  – Costa Rica
Cora terricoleslia  – Bolivia
Cora timucua  – Florida, United States (possibly extinct)
Cora totonacorum  – Veracruz, Mexico
Cora trindadensis  – Ilha da Trindade (Brazil)
Cora udebeceana  – Colombia
Cora undulata  – Colombia
Cora urceolata  – Colombia
Cora verjonensis  – Colombia
Cora viliewoa  – Costa Rica; Colombia; Ecuador
Cora yukiboa  – Puerto Rico
Cora zapotecorum  – Oaxaca, Mexico

References

Cited literature

Agaricales genera
Lichen genera
Taxa named by Elias Magnus Fries
Taxa described in 1825
Basidiolichens